Zoviyeh-ye Yek-e Sofla (also Romanized as Zovīyeh-ye Yek-e Soflá; also known as Zovīyeh-ye Pā’īn) is a village in Shoaybiyeh-ye Sharqi Rural District, Shadravan District, Shushtar County, Khuzestan Province, Iran. At the 2006 census, its population was 546, in 96 families.

References 

Populated places in Shushtar County